Cineromycin B is an antiadipogenic antibiotic with the molecular formula C17H26O4 which is produced by the bacterium Streptomyces cinerochromogenes.

References

Further reading 

  

Antibiotics
Lactones
Unsaturated compounds